Belarus competed at the 2019 European Games, in Minsk, Belarus from 21 to 30 June 2019. Belarus had previously competed at the 2015 European Games in Baku, Azerbaijan, where it won 43 medals, including 10 golds. As host nation, Belarus automatically received a number in quota places in each sport, regardless of how they fared in the qualification.

Medalists

| width="70%" align="left" valign="top" |

| width="22%" align="left" valign="top" |

Archery

Recurve

Compound

Badminton

Basketball 3x3

Team roster

Men
Maxim Liutych
Mikita Meshcharakou
Andrei Rahozenka
Siarhei Vabishchevich

Women
Natallia Dashkevich
Maryna Ivashchanka
Darya Mahalias
Anastasiya Sushczyk

Summary

Beach soccer

Summary

Boxing

Men

Women

Canoe sprint

Men

Women

Cycling

Road
Men

Women

Track
Sprint

Team sprint

Team pursuit

Keirin

Omnium

Madison

Time trial

Individual pursuit

Endurance

Gymnastics

Acrobatic
Mixed

Women

Aerobic
Mixed

Artistic
Men

Women

Rhythmic
Individual

Group

Trampoline

Judo

Men

Women

Mixed event

Karate

Kata

Kumite
Men

Women

Sambo

Key:
 ML – Minimal advantage by last technical evaluation
 MT – Minimal advantage by technical points
 VH – Total victory – painful hold
 VO – Victory by technical points – the loser without technical points
 VP – Victory by technical points – the loser with technical points
 VS – Total victory by decisive superiority
 VT – Total victory – total throw

Men

Women

Shooting

Men

Women

References

Nations at the 2019 European Games
European Games
2015